Transient receptor potential cation channel subfamily M member 5 (TRPM5), also known as long transient receptor potential channel 5 is a protein that in humans is encoded by the TRPM5 gene.

Function 

TRPM5 is a calcium-activated non-selective cation channel that induces depolarization upon increases in intracellular calcium, it is a signal mediator in chemosensory cells.  Channel activity is initiated by a rise in the intracellular calcium, and the channel permeates monovalent cations as K+ and Na+.
TRPM5 is a key component of taste transduction in the gustatory system of bitter, sweet and umami tastes being activated by high levels of intracellular calcium. It has also been targeted as a possible contributor to fat taste signaling. The calcium dependent opening of TRPM5 produces a depolarizing generator potential which leads to an action potential.

TRPM5 is expressed in pancreatic β-cells where it is involved in the signaling mechanism for insulin secretion. The potentiation of TRPM5 in the β-cells leads to increased insulin secretion and protects against the development of type 2 diabetes in mice. Further expression of TRPM5 can be found in tuft cells, solitary chemosensory cells and several other cell types in the body that have a sensory role.

Drugs modulating TRPM5 
The role of TRPM5 in the pancreatic β-cell makes it a target for the development of novel antidiabetic therapies.

Agonists 
 Steviol glycosides, the sweet compounds in the leaves of the Stevia rebaudiana plant, potentiate the calcium-induced activity of TRPM5. In this way they stimulate the glucose-induced insulin secretion from the pancreatic β-cell.
 Rutamarin, a phytochemical found in Ruta graveolens has been identified as an activator of several TRP channels, including TRPM5 and TRPV1 and inhibits the activity of TRPM8.

Antagonists 
Selective blocking agents of TRPM5 ion channels can be used to identify TRPM5 currents in primary cells. Most identified compounds show, however, a poor selectivity between TRPM4 and TRPM5 or other ion channels. 
 TPPO or TriPhenylPhosphineOxide is the most selective blocker of TRPM5 however, its application suffers due to a poor solubility. 
 Ketoconazole is an antifungal drug that inhibits TRPM5 activity.
 Flufenamic Acid is an NSAID drug that inhibits the activity of TRPM5 or TRPM4.
 Clotrimazole is an antifungal drug and reduces the currents through TRPM5.
 Nicotine inhibits the TRPM5 channel. Through the inhibition of TRPM5, the taste loss observed in people with a smoking habit can be explained.

See also 
 TRPM

References

Further reading

External links 
 
 IUPHAR
 HGNC Gene families
 Pfam

Ion channels